The yellow-throated cuckoo (Chrysococcyx flavigularis) is a species of cuckoo in the family Cuculidae.
It is distributed across the African tropical rainforest.

References

yellow-throated cuckoo
Birds of the African tropical rainforest
yellow-throated cuckoo
yellow-throated cuckoo
Taxonomy articles created by Polbot